Yang-Hui He is a mathematical physicist, who is a Fellow at the London Institute, which is based at the Royal Institution of Great Britain, professor of mathematics at City, University of London, Chang-Jiang Chair professor at Nankai University, as well as Tutor and former Fellow at Merton College, Oxford.  He works on the interface between quantum field theory, string theory, algebraic geometry and number theory, as well as how AI and machine-learning help with these problems.  Yang is author of over 200 scientific publications  and also as a keen communicator of science, 

 he is the President of STEMM Global scientific society, an advisor to BMUCO, and a Fellow of the Epicurean Garden.

Education and career 
Born in Wuhu, China, Yang attended primary schools in China and Australia, and high schools in Australia and Canada.
He received his A.B. in Physics from Princeton University in 1996, with Highest Honours (summa cum laude, Shenstone Prize and Kusaka Memorial Prize), joint with certificates in applied mathematics and in engineering physics. He received his Masters from University of Cambridge in 1997 with Distinction and then obtained his PhD from MIT in 2002 in the Center for Theoretical Physics (NSF Scholarship and MIT Presidential Award) under the supervision of Amihay Hanany.

After postdoctoral work at the University of Pennsylvania, in the group of Burt Ovrut, Yang joined the University of Oxford as FitzJames Fellow and Advanced Fellow of the STFC, UK, working closely with Philip Candelas. He remains a tutor at  Merton College, Oxford when taking up his professorships at the University of London and Nankai University, and more recently, when he joined the London Institute.

Works 

Yang has authored over 200 journal papers, as well as several books, notably:

 Topology and Physics, coedited with C. N. Yang and Mo-Lin Ge, with contributions from Sir Michael Atiyah, Edward Witten, Sir Roger Penrose, Robbert Dijkgraaf et al.
 The Calabi-Yau Landscape, textbook aimed at early PhD students, introducing mathematics to physicists, physics to mathematicians and machine-learning to both.

References

External links 
 
 
 

Mathematical physicists
Academics of the University of London
Academic staff of Nankai University
Quantum physicists
1975 births
Living people